Vides is a surname. Notable people with the surname include:

Adolfo Méndez Vides (born 1956), Guatemalan writer
Bruno Vides (born 1993), Argentine footballer
Carlos Eugenio Vides Casanova (born 1937), Salvadoran politician
Jorge Vides (born 1992), Brazilian sprinter